Abdelkader Lagtaâ  (born in 1948) is a Moroccan film director, known for his work in Morocco and French documentaries.

Biography 
Born in 1948 in Casablanca, Abdelkader Lagtaâ graduated from The National Film School in Lodz in Poland. He directed his first short documentary film, "Rabi et la peinture abstraite" in 1984, followed by "Chaïbia" in 1984, and "Kacimi ou le dévoilement" in 1985. He directed his first feature film, "Un amour à Casablanca" in 1991, for which he was also the scriptwriter, editor and producer. When the film was released in Morocco the following year it was a great success and was selected to compete in many festivals. In 1995 he directed "Happy end", a short film which was part of the feature film "Cinq films pour cent ans" in commemoration of the centenary of the cinema. In 1998, he finished two feature films at the same time as director, scriptwriter and co-producer: "La Porte close" (started in 1993) and "Les Casablancais".

Selected filmography

Feature films 
 1991:  Un amour à Casablanca
 1999:  Les Casablancais
 2003:  Face to Face (Face à face)
 2011:  Entre Désir et incertitude

References

External links
 

1948 births
Living people
Moroccan film directors
Moroccan writers
People from Casablanca